Momir Stojanović (born 1958) is a politician and retired general in Serbia. He was the head of military intelligence for Serbia and Montenegro in 2003–04 and later served in the National Assembly of Serbia from 2012 to 2016 as a member of the Serbian Progressive Party (Srpska napredna stranka, SNS). He is now an independent.

Stojanović has been accused on different occasions of committing war crimes in the Kosovo War of the late 1990s. He has consistently rejected the accusations as untrue.

Early life
Stojanović was born to a Serb family in Đakovica, in what was then the Autonomous Region of Kosovo and Metohija in the People's Republic of Serbia, Federal People's Republic of Yugoslavia.

Military career
Stojanović served as deputy head of security for the Yugoslavian army's Priština Corps from 1993 to 1996 and as head of security from 1996 to 1999. In May 1999, during the NATO bombing of Yugoslavia, he was placed on a European Union travel ban. He was appointed as head of the operational department of the Priština Corps Command on 15 May 2002.

On 25 March 2003, the Serbia and Montenegro Supreme Defence Council appointed Stojanović as head of the country's Military Security Service (VSB), in which capacity he was responsible to the general staff of the Armed Forces of Serbia and Montenegro. Following his appointment, human rights activist Nataša Kandić issued a public letter accusing Stojanović of breaching the Geneva Convention and domestic laws on the protection of citizens during the Kosovo War. He rejected the accusations, saying, "I have never in my military career breached the Geneva Convention or the domestic norms on the protection of times of armed conflict." He added that Kondić's letter had erroneously identified him as head of operations for the Priština Corps during the Kosovo War and accused him of issuing orders for which he was not and could not have been responsible.

Stojanović announced in December 2003 that Serbia and Montenegro's VSB would be replaced by a new entity called the Military Security Agency (VBA), falling under the authority of the civilian ministry of defence. The new organization was established on 1 January 2004 with Stojanović in the role of director; he indicated that the agency's main goal would be the fight against domestic and international terrorism and organized crime. The new agency was criticized by representatives the government of Montenegro, including retired general Blagoje Grahovac, who raised objections around the manner of its creation.

Stojanović made a number of controversial statements in early 2004. He claimed that representatives of Al-Qaeda were active in Kosovo, northern Albania, and the predominantly Albanian areas of west Macedonia, and that other Islamist extremist organizations of a Wahhabist orientation were active within Serbia and Montenegro, including in the Sandžak and the northern part of Montenegro. He added that the strategic goal of these extremist groups was to create an independent Muslim state in the Balkans. Stojanović also said that agents from Serbia and Montenegro had infiltrated the "leadership of the separatist movement" and the "leadership of the terrorist organizations" within Kosovo. He subsequently elaborated that the VBA was monitoring these groups with reference to their involvement in paramilitary organization and the illegal arms trade and their actions toward the Serb community, and that the VBA's actions were not unusual within the broader framework of intelligence gathering.

Stojanović's claims were widely criticized. The Albanian and Macedonian governments rejected the suggestion that Al-Qaeda was active on their territories, and the North Atlantic Treaty Organization (NATO) denied that the group had a presence in Kosovo. (NATO officials also dismissed Stojanović's claims about the infiltration of Kosovo paramilitary groups.) The Sandžak Democratic Party called on Stojanović to substantiate his claims about extremist groups in their area, and federal minister Rasim Ljajić accused Stojanović of "sull[ying] the reputation of an entire region" by not presenting specific information about the alleged terrorist groups. Perhaps the most damaging criticism, however, came from Montenegrin officials. Blagoje Grahovac described Stojanović's claims about Islamist extremist infiltration of the region as "a scandal of international proportions," and Montenegrin assembly president Ranko Krivokapić said that he would seek Stojanović's dismissal from office.

Stojanović was, in fact, dismissed from office on 27 May 2004. Serbia and Montenegro president Svetozar Marović indicated that he had been fired for making unauthorized statements about agents in Kosovo. He was subsequently promoted to the rank of major-general and reassigned as the main commander of the army's Niš Corps. He was mandated to retire from the military in 2005; eight years later, he won a lawsuit against the state for illegal retirement.

Politician

Socialist Party of Serbia
Stojanović entered political life after leaving the military. He initially joined the far-right Serbian Radical Party (Srpska radikalna stranka, SRS) in 2007, though he left the party later in the year to join the Socialist Party of Serbia (Socijalistička partija Srbije, SPS).

In October 2007, he charged that the Albanian National Army paramilitary organization was active in Kosovo, Montenegro, western Macedonia, and Albania. He also stated that Albanian paramilitaries were planning for the possibility of an attack on the predominantly Serb community northern Kosovska Mitrovica in the event that Kosovo did not achieve independence via diplomatic means.

He was elected to the Niš city assembly in the 2008 Serbian local elections after receiving the second position on the Socialist Party's electoral list. The SPS and its allies won seven mandates and, after the election, joined a local coalition government led by the Democratic Party (Demokratska stranka, DS); Stojanović supported the administration in the assembly. His first term in elected office was brief; he resigned from the assembly in early 2009.

Serbian Progressive Party
Stojanović later left the SPS and, in 2010, joined the Progressive Party. He was given the sixty-fifth position on the party's Let's Get Serbia Moving list in the 2012 Serbian parliamentary election and was elected when the list won seventy-three mandates. The Progressives and Socialists subsequently formed a coalition government, and Stojanović served as part of its parliamentary majority. He also appeared in the fourth position on the SNS's list for Niš in the 2012 Serbian local elections and was re-elected when the list won seventeen mandates.

In late 2013, Stojanović was one of two candidates nominated for director of Serbia's Security Intelligence Agency (Bezbednosno-informativna agencija, BIA). He was ultimately not appointed to the position. During his first term in parliament, he urged passage of a law to ban the participation of Serbian nationals as volunteers or mercenaries in international conflicts.

He was promoted to the twenty-sixth position on the SNS list in the 2014 Serbian parliamentary election and was re-elected when the list won a landslide victory with 158 out of 250 mandates. In the 2014–16 term, he served as president of the assembly's security services control committee. In this capacity, he encouraged the reform and rationalization of Serbia's intelligence services, with new integrated agencies for intelligence, counter-intelligence, and fight against organized crime. In May 2015, he said that Serbia's main security threat was the realization of the "Greater Albania" project by Albanian irredentists. He also argued that Serbia should not, on security grounds, run the risk of losing territory in southern Central Serbia (i.e., in Preševo and the surrounding area) in the context of defending its interests in the north of Kosovo.

During his second term in the national assembly, Stojanović was also a member of the defence and internal affairs committee and the committee on Kosovo and Metohija, a member of Serbia's delegation to the parliamentary assembly of the Collective Security Treaty Organization, the leader of Serbia's parliamentary friendship group with Mexico, and a member of the friendship groups with Belarus, Brazil, Cuba, Malta, Russia, Slovenia, and Tunisia.

In February 2015, Stojanović was placed on an Interpol red notice by the United Nations Interim Administration Mission in Kosovo (UNMIK) at the instigation of the Basic Court in Gjakova [Đakovica] on the charge of war crimes during the Kosovo War. Stojanović responded that the charge was obviously political, made in retaliation to a United Nations decision to form a court to adjudicate war crimes by the Kosovo Liberation Army (KLA), and with the intent of creating a climate of fear among Kosovo Serbs to prevent them from returning to the disputed territory. He added that he was innocent of the charge and that it was inappropriate for a municipal court to have initiated the action. On a later occasion, he described the charge against him as "totally ridiculous" and said, "in Kosovo today it is possible to bribe any false witness to testify against any member of the Serbian army or police."

Independent politician
Stojanović was not a candidate in the 2016 parliamentary election. Citing differences with the local SNS leadership, he ran for the Niš city assembly at the head of the independent Sincerely for Niš list in the 2016 local elections and was re-elected when the list won three mandates. He formally left the SNS later in the year.

In June 2019, he stated that Serbia's approach to surveillance and data harvesting was chaotic and in need of reform.

Stojanović contested the 2020 Serbian parliamentary election as one of two list bearers for the People's Blok coalition, along with New Serbia leader Velimir Ilić. The list was not successful, falling well below the electoral threshold for assembly representation. Stojanović also ran for re-election to the Niš city assembly at the head of the People's Blok list; he was endorsed by the People's Freedom Movement (Narodni slobodarski pokret, NSP), although it does not appear he actually was a member of the party. The local list, as well, fell below the electoral threshold.

Stojanović remains a frequent commentator on security issues in the Serbian media. In 2021, he said that former Serbian interior minister Nebojša Stefanović was not personally responsible for illegal activities by his department in the wiretapping of Serbian president Aleksandar Vučić.

References

1958 births
Living people
People from Gjakova
Kosovo Serbs
Serbian generals
Members of the National Assembly (Serbia)
Members of the Parliamentary Assembly of the Collective Security Treaty Organization
Socialist Party of Serbia politicians
Serbian Progressive Party politicians